Gilla Band (formerly Girl Band) are an Irish post-punk and noise rock band from Dublin. It was founded in 2011 and comprises vocalist Dara Kiely, guitarist Alan Duggan, bassist Daniel Fox, and drummer Adam Faulkner.

Their career began with the 2012 single "In My Head", followed by the track "You're a Dog", which led to them developing live followings in both Ireland and the UK, and a recording contract with Rough Trade in 2015. That year The Irish Times described them as "the most fascinating act out of these parts at present...[who make] thrilling, menacing, exciting noise".

To date they have released a series of singles and EPs, the critically acclaimed album Holding Hands with Jamie (2015), after a gap in 2016-7 due to health issues, the techno- and glam-influenced The Talkies (2019), and then Most Normal (2022).

History

Early years 
The band was formed in Dublin in July 2011 by vocalist Dara Kiely, guitarist Alan Duggan, bassist Daniel Fox and drummer Adam Faulkner. Duggan, Kiely and Fox had played in the indie rock band Harrows. Harrows formed when the members were in secondary school at the age of 16 and was described by Kiely and Fox as "a shit version of the Strokes". They did not sign to a record label whilst active and have uploaded what few songs they had recorded to YouTube and Myspace.

In April 2012 they released their debut single "In My Head" on Any Other City Records. They self-financed a music video for the track "Leave Again". Kiely played drums in Harrows and it was not until after Harrows disbanded that he attempted singing.

The band followed the single with the self-produced France 98 EP which was recorded live and released through Any Other City. They then recorded a cover of "Why They Hide Their Bodies Under My Garage?" by techno artist Blawan, which furthered their reputation and expanded their fan base, setting them up for a handful of UK tour dates throughout April 2013.

Rough Trade 
Girl Band released a number of  limited 7" singles throughout 2014 on Any Other City records, and in December 2014 signed to Rough Trade Records. The record deal came about after the founder of the label, Geoff Travis saw them perform numerous times, and he wanted to "facilitate what [the band was] doing [at the time] on a bigger scale". They were given full creative control and allowed to produce their own records. They released their self-produced debut album Holding Hands With Jamie on Rough Trade in September 2015.

The Talkies 
In June 2019, Girl Band released "Shoulderblades", their first single in four years. A second single titled "Going Norway" followed in August 2019. The songs are the singles for the band's second album The Talkies, which was released by Rough Trade on 27 September. The album's repetitive and experimental sound is characterized by its unorthodox use of effects-laden guitars, abstract stream of consciousness lyrics and stylistic borrowings from techno & industrial music. Critics have described the album as noise rock & post-punk, with many praising its dark and unsettling tone.

Name change 
In November 2021, the band announced they were changing their name from Girl Band to Gilla Band. The band stated that they changed their name because it was a "misgendered name" and that their former name could have been "propagating a culture of non-inclusivity."

Style 
The band's debut album was well received by music critics. Pitchfork said that "Dara Kiely brings heavy vibes and great songs to Girl Band's new album. Should you laugh? Holding Hands With Jamie is as discomfiting as Kiely’s mental state". The Guardian described the band as "full of sound and fury" and stated "This Irish four-piece howls at you from the very start, an unbroken series of thumping, crashing songs strewn with fractured, imagistic lyrics".

Rolling Stone wrote than Kiely's vocal performance "sure sounds convincing. But he doesn't seem too shy about it, either – less like someone cowering embarrassedly in his room than a guy who's turned his fish-belly skin and concave abs into a creepy point of pride. That kind of confrontational, matter-of-fact ugliness is what this Irish post-punk crew does so well, torturing their instruments with dead-eyed precision and diabolical resolve. The dank, relentless music sounds like it was recorded in a meat locker under a fallout shelter". Rolling Stone compared the band to Liars and Nick Cave's Birthday Party.

Influences 
Drummer Adam Faulkner has said that "most of the bands we get compared to we don’t really listen to. For ages, for like a whole year, we got compared to Mclusky, and none of us ever listened to it. And then we all did and were just like, Nah, don’t like it." The band's influences include Bad Brains, James Chance and the Contortions, Neu!, and The Chemical Brothers. The band made a conscious effort to avoid sounding like landfill indie and "to not sound like Radiohead, because there were tonnes of bands in Dublin who were just really bad versions of them."

Band members 
 Dara Kiely – vocals
 Alan Duggan – guitar
 Daniel Fox – bass guitar
 Adam Faulkner – drums

Discography

Studio albums

EPs

Singles

Music videos

Other appearances

References

External links
 Girl Band live on KEXP 
 Girl Band performimng "Paul" at Pitchfork Music Festival, 2016

Noise rock groups
Irish indie rock groups
Musical groups established in 2011
2011 establishments in Ireland
Musical groups from Dublin (city)
Rough Trade Records artists